Milltown Bridge is a bridge over the River Dodder in Milltown, Dublin, Ireland. It is on the Dundrum Road, part of the R117 road, and includes a pedestrian underpass.

References

Bridges in Dublin (city)